Stefan Alexander Ljubičić (born 5 October 1999) is an Icelandic professional footballer of Serbian descent, who plays as a forward for KR Reykjavík in the Úrvalsdeild.

Club career

Brighton & Hove Albion
After 16-year old Ljubičić had played three games for Keflavík and several games for the youth national teams, he went on a trial at English club Norwich in October 2015 and later at Scottish club Celtic in January 2016.

However, after yet another trial, this time at Brighton & Hove Albion where he scored a goal and played very well in a friendly game against Chelsea's youth team, it was confirmed by the players agent and Keflavík, that Ljubičić had accepted a three-year offer from the club. He would join the club in the summer 2016.

Ljubičić played for Brighton's U18 and U23 teams. In February 2018, he was loaned out to Bognor Regis Town until the end of the season. In January 2019, he was loaned out to Eastbourne Borough until the end of April 2019. However, it was confirmed in May 2019, that Ljubičić had been released.

He played a total of 35 games and 12 goals for Brighton's U18 team and 8 games for the U23 team.

Grindavík
After being released by Brighton, Ljubičić returned to Grindavík in July 2019. He made eight appearances and scored one goal for the club.

Riga FC
At the beginning of November, Ljubičić joined the training camp of Latvian club Riga FC in Cyprus. He played a friendly game for the team against Pafos FC where he scored a goal. He then signed officially for the club at the end of the month. However, before playing any official games for the club, the cooperation was terminated by mutual agreement on 26 May 2020. Ljubičić had had a few minor injuries, which prevented him from playing.

HK
On 15 June 2020, Ljubičić signed a three-year deal with Icelandic club Handknattleiksfélag Kópavogs. He scored his first goal for HK on 28 August the same year. After HK was relegated for the 2022 season, Ljubičić left the club at the end of 2021.

KR Reykjavík
On 19 October 2021 it was confirmed, that Ljubičić would join KR Reykjavík for the 2022 season.

Personal life
Stefan is the son of Bosnian Serb refugee Zoran Ljubičić, former Icelandic football player and coach. His older brother, Bojan Stefan Ljubičić, is also a footballer. In his youth, Stefan played basketball for Keflavík ÍF for four years and was a member of the Icelandic junior national basketball teams.

References

External links
 
 

1999 births
Living people
Stefan Ljubicic
Stefan Ljubicic
Stefan Ljubicic
Úrvalsdeild karla (football) players
Stefan Ljubicic
Brighton & Hove Albion F.C. players
Bognor Regis Town F.C. players
Eastbourne Borough F.C. players
Stefan Ljubicic
Riga FC players
Stefan Ljubicic
Stefan Ljubicic
Association football forwards
Stefan Ljubicic
Expatriate footballers in England
Expatriate footballers in Latvia
Stefan Ljubicic